Emiliano Zurita is a Mexican actor, writer and producer, best known for his role as Felipe Quintanilla in the Telemundo' series Señora Acero (2018–2019). He is the son of actors Christian Bach and Humberto Zurita. And younger brother of Sebastián Zurita. Zurita is a graduate of the Pratt Institute in New York as an architect. At the same time he studied acting at Susan Batson Studios, with James E. Lee and Susan Batson. He recently served as producer and writer of the Amazon Prime Video comedy series How to Survive Being Single with his brother, with whom he has a production company called Addiction House.

Filmography

Film roles

Television roles

Other works

References

External links 
 

Mexican male telenovela actors
21st-century Mexican actors
21st-century Mexican male actors
21st-century Mexican writers
Mexican male film actors
Mexican television producers
Mexican male television actors
Pratt Institute alumni
Year of birth missing (living people)
Living people